Nandanam is a neighborhood in Chennai, India. It is a busy location and is home to many commercial institutions. This locality also offers a calm residential location. Nandanam Arts College was established in 1901. Nandanam Junction, on the arterial road Anna Salai, (commonly referred as "Nandanam signal") is one of the busiest junctions in Chennai.

History
Nandanam seems to have originated in the piece of land known as Gambier's Gardens named after Chief Justice Edward John Gambier who owned the property from 1836 to 1850. The township got its name in the 1950s as a result of the housing development efforts instituted during the Chief Ministership of Rajagopalachari which concentrated on developing a green Chennai.

Transportation
Nandanam has some MTC bus stops located on Anna Salai. Many buses pass through this area and offer connectivity to various places.

The nearest suburban railway stations are Mambalam and Saidapet.

Nandanam has a Chennai Metro station called Nandanam metro station.

References

Neighbourhoods in Chennai